Tawnluia is an Indian politician from Mizo National Front. He is the second and  current  Deputy Chief Minister of Mizoram.

Career
He has joined the Mizo National Front since 1963. He was the  former commander-in-chief of the disbanded Mizo National Army (MNA) for over 20 years.

He has been elected to the Mizoram Legislative Assembly on MNF Ticket in the years 1987, 1989, 1998 and 2003. He again won the Tuichang Assembly seat in the year 2018. He is also the current Senior Vice President of the Mizo National Front party. He has also been the Home Minister in previous MNF Ministry in 1998 and 2003.

Personal life
He is married to Lalhmingmawii.

References 

Mizo National Front politicians
Mizoram MLAs 2018–2023
Mizo people
People from Aizawl
Living people
1943 births